Elizabeth "Libby" Anne Jackson  (born 18 March 1981) is a British space exploration expert who works for the UK Space Agency.

Early life and education 
Libby Jackson's enthusiasm for space travel started young, when, as a seven-year-old, she wrote a Travel Guide to Mars. Aged fifteen she attended Space School, before choosing A-Levels in Physics, Maths, Further Maths and Music. She developed an interest in human spaceflight aged seventeen, after shadowing a flight director at NASA Johnson Space Center. She went on to complete a BSc in physics at Imperial College London in 2002 and an MSc in Astronautics and Space Engineering at Cranfield University in 2003.

Career 
After graduating from Cranfield, Jackson worked as a graduate engineer at EADS Astrium. From 2007, Libby Jackson worked at Europe's control centre for the International Space Station (ISS) as a flight instructor and controller. She became director for the ISS European Space Agency (ESA) Columbus Module in 2010. Jackson joined the UK Space Agency in 2014 and became spokesperson for Tim Peake's mission to the ISS.  In 2016 and 2018, Jackson spoke at the National Student Space Conference, hosted by UK Students for the Exploration and Development of Space (UKSEDS), the UK's national student space society. She coordinated the UK Space Agency education and outreach programme for Peake's mission.  She previously managed the Human Exploration Programme at the UK Space Agency, representing the UK's interest in human spaceflight and microgravity, and is currently the Head of Space Exploration. 

In July 2019 she was awarded an honorary Doctor of Science degree by the University of Kent and in the 2022 New Year Honours was awarded an Order of the British Empire "for services to the Space Sector".

Public engagement and outreach 
Jackson works to improve the public perception of space science and engineering, contributing to mainstream media and speaking at large events. In 2016, Jackson ran the London Marathon in an astronaut costume, whilst at the same event, Tim Peake became the first male to run a marathon in space. She was part of the team awarded the Sir Arthur Clarke Award from the British Interplanetary Society in 2016 for the outreach activities surrounding Tim Peake's Principia Mission. Her first book, A Galaxy of Her Own, was published in 2017. Her second book, Space Explorers, was published in 2020.

References 

1981 births
Living people
British women physicists
British physicists
British women engineers
English engineers
English aerospace engineers
British space scientists
Women space scientists
21st-century women engineers